The Guam Football Association is the governing body of association football in the United States territory of Guam.

Association staff

National teams
Guam national football team
Guam women's national football team

Tournament
Guam Soccer League
Guam FA Cup

References

External links
Official website
Guam at the FIFA website.
Guam at the AFC website.

Football in Guam
Guam
Football
Sports organizations established in 1975
1975 establishments in Guam